was the founder and first shōgun of the Ashikaga shogunate. His rule began in 1338, beginning the Muromachi period of Japan, and ended with his death in 1358. He was a male-line descendant of the samurai of the (Minamoto) Seiwa Genji line (meaning they were descendants of Emperor Seiwa) who had settled in the Ashikaga area of Shimotsuke Province, in present-day Tochigi Prefecture.

According to Zen master and intellectual Musō Soseki, who enjoyed his favor and collaborated with him, Takauji had three qualities. First, he kept his cool in battle and was not afraid of death. Second, he was merciful and tolerant. Third, he was very generous with those below him.

Life

His childhood name was Matagorō (又太郎). Takauji was a general of the Kamakura shogunate sent to Kyoto in 1333 to put down the Genkō War which had started in 1331. After becoming increasingly disillusioned with the Kamakura shogunate over time, Takauji joined the banished Emperor Go-Daigo and Kusunoki Masashige, and seized Kyoto. Soon after, Nitta Yoshisada joined their cause, and laid siege to Kamakura. When the city fell to Nitta, the Shogunal regent, Hōjō Takatoki, and his clansmen committed suicide. This ended the Kamakura shogunate, as well as the Hōjō clan's power and influence. Go-Daigo was enthroned once more as emperor, reestablishing the primacy of the Imperial court in Kyoto and starting the so-called Kenmu Restoration.

However, shortly thereafter, the samurai clans became increasingly disillusioned with the reestablished imperial court, which sought to return to the social and political systems of the Heian period. Sensing their discontent, Takauji pleaded with the emperor to do something before rebellion would break out, however his warnings were ignored.

Hōjō Tokiyuki, son of Takatoki, took the opportunity to start the Nakasendai rebellion to try to reestablish the shogunate in Kamakura in 1335. Takauji put down the rebellion and took Kamakura for himself. Taking up the cause of his fellow samurai, he claimed the title of Sei-i Taishōgun and allotted land to his followers without permission from the court. Takauji announced his allegiance to the imperial court, but Emperor Go-Daigo sent Nitta Yoshisada to reclaim Kamakura.

Takauji defeated Yoshisada in the battles of Sanoyama and Mishima.  This cleared the path for Takauji and Tadayoshi to march on to Kyoto. He captured Kyoto for a few days in February 1336, only to be driven out and fled to Kyūshū due to the arrival of forces under Prince Takanaga, Prince Norinaga, Kitabatake Akiie and Yūki Munehiro.

After Takauji and his brother were forced to retreat to the west, he then allied himself with the clans native to Kyūshū.  After defeating the Kikuchi clan at Hakata Bay in the Battle of Tatarahama (1336), Takauji was "virtually master of Kyushu". His brother advanced simultaneously by land and both reached the environs of present-day Kobe in July.

At the decisive Battle of Minatogawa in 1336, Takauji defeated Yoshisada again and killed Masashige, allowing him to seize Kyoto for good. Emperor Kōmyō of the illegitimate Northern Court (see below) was installed as emperor by Takauji in opposition to the exiled Southern Court, beginning the turbulent Northern and Southern Court period (Nanbokuchō), which saw two emperors fight each other and which would last for almost 60 years.

Besides other honors, Emperor Go-Daigo had given Takauji the title of Chinjufu-shōgun, or Commander-in-chief of the Defense of the North, and the courtly title of the Fourth Rank, Junior Grade. His Buddhist name was Tojiinden Niyama Myogi dai koji Chojuji-dono (等持院殿仁山妙義大居士長寿寺殿).

Family
Parents and siblings
 Father: Ashikaga Sadauji (足利 貞氏; 1273–1331)
 Mother: Uesugi Kiyoko (上杉 清子; 1270–1343)
 Siblings:
 Half-siblings: Ashikaga Takayoshi (足利高義; 1297–1317)
 Natural Siblings:
 Ashikaga Maagoro
 Ashikaga Tadayoshi (足利 直義)
Consorts and issue:
 Wife: Akahashi Toshi (赤橋 登子; 1306– 4 May 1365)
Son: Ashikaga Yoshiakira (足利 義詮, July 4, 1330 – December 28, 1367) 
Son: Ashikaga Motouji (足利基氏) (1340–1367)
Daughter: Tsur-ō (鶴王; d.1353)
 Concubine: Kako no Tsubone 
Son: Ashikaga Takewakamaru (足利 竹若丸; d. 1333)
Concubine: Echizen no Tsubone (越前局)
 Adopted son: Ashikaga Tadafuyu ( 足利 直冬; 1327–1387) 
Concubine Unknown name
Daughter: Unknown name (d. 2 October 1342)
Son: Seiōmaru (聖王丸; d 1 August 1345)
Daughter: Ashikaga Tadayoshi's adopted daughter  (d.14 October 1347)
Daughter: Unknown name
Son:  Noritoshi Einaka (英仲法俊; d. 26 February 1416)

Family tree

Timeline of shogunate
Significant events which shaped the period during which Takauji was shōgun are:
 1338 – Takauji appointed shōgun.
 1349 – Go-Murakami flees to A'no; Ashikaga Tadayoshi and Kō no Moronao quarrel; Ashikaga Motouji, son of Takauji, appointed Kamakura Kanrei
 1350 – Tadayoshi, excluded from administration, turns priest; Tadayoshi's adopted son, Ashikaga Tadafuyu is wrongly repudiated as a rebel.
 1351–1358 – Struggle for Kyoto.
 1351 – Tadayoshi joins Southern Court, southern army takes Kyoto; truce, Takauji returns to Kyoto; Tadayoshi and Takauji reconciled; Kō no Moronao and Kō no Moroyasu are exiled.
 1352 – Tadayoshi dies, Southern army recaptures Kyoto; Nitta Yoshimune captures Kamakura; Ashikaga forces recapture Kamakura and Kyoto; Tadafuyu joins Southern Court; Yamana Tokiuji joins Tadafuyu.
 1353 – Kyoto retaken by Southern forces under Yamana Tokiuji; retaken by Ashikaga forces.
 1354 – Takauji flees with Go-Kōgon; Kitabatake Chikafusa dies.
 1355 – Kyoto taken by Southern army; Kyoto retaken by Ashikaga forces.
 1358 – Takauji dies.

Takauji's son Ashikaga Yoshiakira succeeded him as shōgun after his death. His grandson Ashikaga Yoshimitsu united the Northern and Southern courts in 1392.

Eras of Takauji's bakufu 
Because of the anomalous situation, which he had himself created and which saw two Emperors reign simultaneously, one in Yoshino and one in Kyoto, the years in which Takauji was shōgun as reckoned by the Gregorian calendar are identified in Japanese historical records by two different series of Japanese era names (nengō), that following the datation used by the legitimate Southern Court and that formulated by the pretender Northern Court.

Eras as reckoned by the Southern Court (declared legitimate by a Meiji era decree because in possession at the time of the Japanese Imperial Regalia):
 Engen                           (1336–1340)
 Kōkoku                          (1340–1346)
 Shōhei                           (1346–1370)
Eras as reckoned by the pretender Northern Court (declared illegitimate by a Meiji era decree because not in possession at the time of the Japanese Imperial Regalia):
  Ryakuō                         (1338–1342)
  Kōei                              (1342–1345)
  Jōwa                             (1345–1350)
  Kan'ō or Kannō             (1350–1352)
  Bunna                           (1352–1356)
  Enbun                           (1356–1361)

Literary references
The story of Ashikaga Takauji, Emperor Go-Daigo, Nitta Yoshisada, and Kusunoki Masashige from the Genko rebellion to the establishment of the Northern and Southern Courts is detailed in the 40 volume Muromachi period epic Taiheiki.

Honours
Junior First Rank (9 July 1358; posthumous)

References

Sources 

Ackroyd, Joyce I. (1982) Lessons from History: the Tokushi Yoron. Brisbane: University of Queensland Press.  ; OCLC 7574544
 Matsuo, Kenji. (1997). 中世都市鎌倉をく: 源頼朝から上杉謙信まで (Chūsei toshi Kamakura o aruku: Minamoto no Yoritomo kara Uesugi Kenshin made). Tokyo: Chūkō Shinsho. ; OCLC 38970710
 Titsingh, Isaac. (1834). Nihon Ōdai Ichiran; ou, Annales des empereurs du Japon.  Paris: Royal Asiatic Society, Oriental Translation Fund of Great Britain and Ireland. OCLC 585069

External links

1305 births
1358 deaths
14th-century Japanese people
14th-century shōguns
Takauji
People of Kamakura-period Japan
People of Nanboku-chō-period Japan
Takauji